Teuvoa is a genus of lichen-forming fungi in the family Megasporaceae. The genus was circumscribed in 2013 by Mohammad Sohrabi and Steven Leavitt with Teuvoa uxoris assigned as the type species. The genus was segregated from the large genus Aspicilia after molecular phylogenetic analysis revealed that the Aspicilia uxoris species group formed a monophyletic clade that represented an independent lineage within the Megasporaceae. Three species were initially placed in the genus; two additional species from China were added in 2018. Teuvoa is distinguished from Aspicilia by its small ascospores and conidia (the latter measuring 5–8 μm), and the lack of secondary metabolites. The genus name honours Finnish lichenologist Teuvo Ahti, "one of the prominent lichen taxonomists of the 20th century".

Species
Teuvoa alpina 
Teuvoa junipericola 
Teuvoa saxicola 
Teuvoa tibetica 
Teuvoa uxoris

References

Pertusariales
Pertusariales genera
Lichen genera
Taxa described in 2013